The 2013 Scottish Challenge Cup final, also known as the Ramsdens Cup final for sponsorship reasons, was an association football match between Queen of the South and Partick Thistle on 7 April 2013 at Almondvale Stadium in Livingston. It was the 22nd final of the Scottish Challenge Cup since it was first organised in 1990 to celebrate the centenary of the Scottish Football League.

Both teams progressed through four elimination rounds to reach the final. The match was Queen of the South's fourth appearance in the final of the competition, the last in 2010, whilst it was Partick Thistle's first cup final in 42 years since the League Cup in 1971. The tournament was contested by clubs below the Scottish Premier League; Partick Thistle from the First Division and Queen of the South from the Second Division.

The scoreline was 0–0 after 90 minutes of normal time which forced 30 minutes of extra time to be played. Queen of the South scored the first goal of the game in the 101st minute from Nicky Clark. Partick Thistle were awarded a penalty kick with only two minutes left to play and missed; Aaron Muirhead, who missed the penalty, was then sent off for headbutting Chris Higgins. Partick equalised the score to 1–1 in the final minute of the match from Kris Doolan and take the game to penalties. Queen of the South emerged victorious after winning the shoot-out 6–5.

Route to the final 

The competition is a knock-out tournament and in 2012–13 was contested by 32 teams; the 30 clubs that played in the First, Second and Third Divisions of the Scottish Football League and two Highland Football League clubs by invitation. For the first and second rounds only, the draw was divided into two geographical regions – north/east and south/west. Teams were paired at random and the winner of each match progressed to the next round and the loser was eliminated.

Queen of the South

Partick Thistle

Match

Details

References

2013
3
Scottish Challenge Cup Final 2013
Scottish Challenge Cup Final 2013
finals
Scottish Challenge Cup Final